Founded in 1947, the Johns Hopkins Writing Seminars is an academic program offering undergraduate and graduate degrees in writing in the Zanvyl Krieger School of Arts & Sciences at Johns Hopkins University. It is the second-oldest creative writing program in the United States. 

Notable faculty of the program have included Edward Albee, John Barth, Madison Smartt Bell, J. M. Coetzee, Mary Jo Salter, Stephen Dixon, Mark Hertsgaard, Brad Leithauser, John Irwin, J.D. McClatchy, Alice McDermott, Mark Crispin Miller, Andrew Motion, Wyatt Prunty, David St. John, Mark Strand, Robert Stone, and David Yezzi.

Writer David Yezzi currently chairs the program, which has a strong reputation. It has been ranked "One of the Top Ten Graduate Programs in Creative Writing"  by The Atlantic.  In 1997, U.S. News & World Report ranked the program second in the United States out of sixty-five eligible full-residency MFA programs. In 2011, Poets & Writers ranked Hopkins seventeenth nationally out of 157 eligible full-residency MFA programs. The long respected Science Writing program was closed down in 2013 as an on-campus program, but was re-established as an online/low residency program shortly thereafter.

Degree programs
 Writing Seminars B.A. Degree
 MFA in Fiction and Poetry

Notable graduates

Chimamanda Ngozi Adichie
John Astin
Jami Attenberg
Beth Bachmann
Russell Baker
Ned Balbo
Frederick Barthelme
Jeffrey Blitz
Paul Harris Boardman
Jennifer Finney Boylan
Lucie Brock-Broido
John Gregory Brown
Vikram Chandra (novelist)
Iris Chang
Julie Checkoway  
Wes Craven
Erica Dawson
Elizabeth DeVita-Raeburn
Louise Erdrich
Mark Friedman 
Nell Greenfieldboyce
Martha Grimes 
Rachel Hadas
Gil Scott-Heron
Lawrence Hill
Jay Hopler
Kimberly Johnson
Pagan Kennedy
Wayne Koestenbaum
Porochista Khakpour
Tim Kreider
Aaron Kunin
Phillis Levin
David Lipsky
Rosemary Mahoney
Emma Marris
Gardner McFall, 
Tomás Q. Morín,
P.J. O'Rourke 
ZZ Packer
Molly Peacock
Hollis Robbins
Deborah Rudacille 
Natalie Shapero
Tom Sleigh
Elizabeth Spires 
Lorin Stein
Susan Stewart 
Rosanna Warren
Rachel Wetzsteon
Greg Williamson

Turnbull Lectures
The Writing Seminars hosts the Turnbull Lectures, a yearly lecture series on the topic of poetry. The series was established in 1891 and has run almost continuously between the years 1891-1984 and 2000–present. Over the history of the series, lectures have been given by Ramón Menéndez Pidal, T.S. Eliot, W.H. Auden, Marianne Moore, Robert Frost, Jacques Derrida, Helen Vendler, and many others. Recent lecturers have included Tracy K. Smith, Terrance Hayes, Richard Wilbur, Paul Muldoon, Stanley Plumly, Edward Mendelson, and Edna Longley.

See also
 The Hopkins Review

External links
 Writing Seminars homepage at the JHU website

References

Johns Hopkins University
1947 establishments in Maryland
Creative writing programs